Manfred Kirchgeorg (born 1958) is a German economist, specialized in the field of marketing management, who holds the SVI-Endowed Chair of Marketing, especially E-Commerce and Cross-Media Management at HHL Leipzig Graduate School of Management.

Academic career 
Kirchgeorg finished his PhD and habilitation in business studies at the University of Münster.

Since 1998, Kirchgeorg has held  the Chair of Marketing Management at HHL Leipzig. In 2013, his chair received an endowment by the Deutsche Post AG, and it now has the title "Deutsche Post Chair of Marketing, especially E-Commerce and Cross-Media Management".

His research projects are organized in three competence centers which cover the areas of Holistic Branding, Sustainability Marketing, Cross-Media Management and E-Commerce. He is a member of numerous associations, including the German Academic Association for Business Research, the American Marketing Association, the Academy of Management, the Beta Gamma Sigma Chapter of AACSB, and the Schmalenbach-Gesellschaft für Betriebswirtschaftslehre e.V.  Moreover, Kirchgeorg is a founding member of the Automotive Cluster of East Germany (ACOD). He is in the board of the Academic Society for Marketing and Business Leadership as well as the Academic Marketing Association and is a member of the global network Microeconomics of Competitiveness (MoC) at Harvard Business School. In December 2017 was appointed new head of the MoC Curriculum Council. In addition, he sits on the supervisory board of the Unilever Germany Holding GmbH and the GfK Verein.

In the Masters in Management Ranking 2014 conducted by the Financial Times, the marketing major of HHL's Master in Management Program occupied one of the top spots (4th place) among the 70 analyzed masters in management programs.

Together with Timo Meynhardt, Andreas Pinkwart, Andreas Suchanek, and Henning Zülch, Kirchgeorg developed the Leipzig Leadership Model, which was published in 2016.

Publications 
 Manfred Kirchgeorg: Ökologieorientiertes Unternehmensverhalten – Typologien und Erklärungsansätze auf empirischer Grundlage. Wiesbaden 1990, 
 Heribert Meffert, Manfred Kirchgeorg: Marktorientiertes Umweltmanagement – Grundlagen und Fallstudien. 3rd edition, Stuttgart 1998, 
 Manfred Kirchgeorg: Marktstrategisches Kreislaufmanagement: Ziele, Strategien und Strukturkonzepte. Wiesbaden 1999, at the same time: habilitations treatise, Universität Münster (Westfalen), 1998, 
 Manfred Kirchgeorg, Werner M. Dornscheidt und Wilhelm Giese: Handbuch Messemanagement. Wiesbaden 2003, 
 Bernd Schäppi, Mogens M. Andreasen, Manfred Kirchgeorg, Franz-Josef Radermacher: Handbuch Produktentwicklung. Wiesbaden 2005, 
 Manfred Kirchgeorg, Werner M. Dornscheidt, Wilhelm Giese, Norbert Stoeck: Trade Show Management. Wiesbaden 2005, 
 Manfred Bruhn, Manfred Kirchgeorg and Johannes Meier: Marktorientierte Führung im wirtschaftlichen und gesellschaftlichen Wandel. Wiesbaden 2007, 
 Manfred Kirchgeorg, Christiane Springer, Christian Brühe: Live Communication Management: Ein strategischer Leitfaden zur Konzeption, Umsetzung und Erfolgskontrolle. Wiesbaden 2009, 
 Christoph Burmann, Heribert Meffert and Manfred Kirchgeorg: Marketing Arbeitsbuch: Aufgaben – Fallstudien – Lösungen. 11th edition, Wiesbaden 2013, 
 Christoph Burmann, Heribert Meffert, Manfred Kirchgeorg and Maik Eisenbeiß: Marketing: Grundlagen marktorientierter Unternehmensführung. 13th edition, Wiesbaden 2018, 
 Heribert Meffert, Peter Kenning, and Manfred Kirchgeorg (Ed.): Sustainable Marketing Management – Grundlagen und Cases. Wiesbaden 2014, 
 Manfred Kirchgeorg, Timo Meynhardt, Andreas Pinkwart, Andreas Suchanek, Henning Zülch, Das Leipziger Führungsmodell: The Leipzig Leadership Model, Leipzig 2017, 
 Manfred Bruhn, Manfred Kirchgeorg, Marketing Weiterdenken: Zukunftspfade für eine marktorientierte Unternehmensführung, Wiesbaden 2017, 
 Manfred Kirchgeorg, Werner M. Dornscheidt, Norbert Stoeck: Handbuch Messemanagement - Planung, Durchführung und Kontrolle von Messen, Kongressen und Events, 2. Aufl., Wiesbaden 2018,

References

External links 
 http://www.hhl.de/en/faculty/marketing/
 http://wissenschaftliche-gesellschaft.de/
 http://www.akademische-marketinggesellschaft.de/

References 

20th-century German economists
1958 births
Living people
21st-century  German  economists